LYAO is the second live album from stand-up comedian Arj Barker. Warner Bros. Records/Degenerate Records comic Arj Barker released his second comedy album, LYAO, on Tuesday, January 26, 2010, after the Comedy Central special premiered Saturday, Jan. 23. LYAO is also available on CD/DVD and standalone DVD.

Track listing 
 LOL
 <3
 WTF
 GTFO
 ROFL
 HFS
 SOS
 LMAO
 JK
 HAHA
 OMG
 BFF

References 

2010 live albums
Arj Barker albums
Warner Records live albums
2010s comedy albums
Stand-up comedy albums
2010s spoken word albums
Spoken word albums by American artists
Live spoken word albums